The 2000–01 season was the 99th in the history of the Western Football League.

The league champions for the sixth time in their history (and the third season running) were Taunton Town, but runners-up Chippenham Town took promotion to the Southern League. The champions of Division One were the newly formed Team Bath.

Final tables

Premier Division
The Premier Division was increased from 19 clubs to 20 after Mangotsfield United were promoted to the Southern League, and two clubs joined:

Devizes Town, champions of the First Division.
Welton Rovers, runners-up in the First Division.

First Division
The First Division was increased from 17 clubs to 20 after Devizes Town and Welton Rovers were promoted to the Premier Division, and five clubs joined:

Bath City Reserves, rejoining the league after leaving in 1992.
Cadbury Heath, promoted from the Gloucestershire County League.
Hallen, transferred and demoted from the Hellenic League.
Team Bath, a newly formed club.
Worle St Johns, promoted from the Somerset Senior League.

References

2000-01
8